Henderson Commercial Historic District or Henderson Commercial District may refer to:

Henderson Commercial District (Henderson, Kentucky), listed on the National Register of Historic Places (NRHP) in Henderson County, Kentucky
Henderson Commercial Historic District (Henderson, Minnesota), listed on the NRHP in Minnesota 
Henderson Commercial Historic District (Henderson, Texas), NRHP-listed

See also
Henderson Central Business Historic District, Henderson, North Carolina, listed on the NRHP in Vance County, North Carolina